Melrose Highlands is one of the oldest neighborhoods in the city of Melrose, Massachusetts. Formerly part of neighboring Stoneham, it became part of Melrose in the latter part of the nineteenth century. There were some addresses that had the zip code  02177, before the Highlands post office was closed; the Melrose zip code of 02176 is now used, although mail marked as 02177 is still deliverable.

It is bordered by Main Street to the east, the Stoneham border to the west, Lynn Fells Parkway to the south, and the Wakefield line and Wakefield's Greenwood neighborhood to the north. The neighborhood was originally part of Stoneham, but was annexed by Melrose on March 18, 1853.

Transportation
Downtown Melrose is a short walk away and access to Boston is available with the use of Melrose Highlands Station on the MBTA's Reading/Haverhill commuter rail line. MBTA bus Route 131 has service from Melrose Highlands to Oak Grove on the Malden/Melrose city line, and to Malden Center, both on the MBTA rapid-transit Orange Line.

References

Melrose, Massachusetts
Neighborhoods in Massachusetts
Populated places in Middlesex County, Massachusetts